A list of works about Copenhagen, Denmark:

List of books, arranged by author

List of works, arranged chronologically

Published in the 19th century

Published in the 20th century

Published in the 21st century
 
 

Culture in Copenhagen
Copenhagen
copenhagen
Copenhagen-related lists